Joseph Atallah Ghiz (January 27, 1945 – November 9, 1996) was the 27th premier of Prince Edward Island from 1986 to 1993, an educator of law and a justice of the Supreme Court of Prince Edward Island. He was the father of Robert Ghiz, the 31st premier of Prince Edward Island.  He was the first premier of a Canadian province to be of non-European descent, since followed by Ujjal Dosanjh and Ghiz's son, Robert.

Early life and family
Ghiz was born in Charlottetown, Prince Edward Island, to Atallah Joseph Ghiz, a Lebanese corner store owner, and Marguerite F. Ghiz (née McKarris). Ghiz was a graduate of Dalhousie and Harvard law schools and was a Charlottetown lawyer before entering into politics.

CBA Committee on the Constitution
Ghiz was active in the Canadian Bar Association. In 1977, in the aftermath of the election of the separatist Parti Québécois government in 1976, he was asked to sit on the CBA Committee on the Constitution. The mandate of the Committee was to study and make recommendations on the Constitution of Canada. The members of the Committee were drawn from each province of Canada, and included two future provincial premiers (Ghiz and Clyde Wells), a future Supreme Court of Canada justice, two future provincial chief justices, and a future Canadian Ambassador to the United Nations. The Committee presented its report to the CBA at the next annual meeting, in 1978. The Committee made wide-ranging recommendations for constitutional change, including a completely new constitution, abolishing the monarchy, changing the Senate, entrenching language rights and a bill of rights, and changing the balance of powers between the federal government and the provinces.

Political career
He became president of the Prince Edward Island Liberal Party in 1977 and then party leader in 1981. His party lost the 1982 election but Ghiz was elected to the legislature and became leader of the opposition. He led the party to victory in 1986 with the Liberals gaining 20 seats to 11 for the Progressive Conservative Party of Prince Edward Island.

In January 1988, Ghiz declared that Islanders would vote in a plebiscite on the question of a "fixed link" to mainland Canada - probably the single most divisive topic in Prince Edward Island during the latter part of the 20th century. Ghiz later in life reported to have voted against the fixed link on his personal vote.

Ghiz supported the Meech Lake Accord and opposed the Canada–United States Free Trade Agreement. His participation in both debates made him a national figure. His government was re-elected in 1989 winning 30 out of 32 seats; it is speculated that this was in reaction to the federal PC government of Brian Mulroney's decision to close CFB Summerside.  Ghiz's government subsequently accepted a $200 million funding agreement for highway construction in exchange for the provincial government allowing the federal Crown corporation CN Rail to abandon railway service in the province.

Ghiz favoured concessions to Quebec in constitutional negotiations and campaigned for the Charlottetown Accord, resigning three months after the accord was defeated in a 1992 referendum.

Later life
Following his decision to leave politics, Ghiz served as dean of his alma mater, the Dalhousie Law School until 1995, when he was appointed as a justice to the Supreme Court of Prince Edward Island. Ghiz died of cancer in 1996. Several weeks before his death, he was driven by construction personnel across the largest completed section of the Confederation Bridge which had yet to be connected to the North American mainland.

His son Robert, served as the 31st Premier of Prince Edward Island from June 12, 2007 to February 23, 2015 (leader of the PEI Liberal Party, 2003–2015). This was the second time in the history of Prince Edward Island that a father-son team both served as premier, the other pair (also Liberal) being Thane Campbell (1936–1943) and his son Alexander B. Campbell (1966–1978).

References

 Ghiz Page

1945 births
1996 deaths
Schulich School of Law alumni
Deaths from cancer in Prince Edward Island
Harvard Law School alumni
Justices of the Supreme Court of Prince Edward Island
Lawyers in Prince Edward Island
People from Charlottetown
Premiers of Prince Edward Island
Prince Edward Island Liberal Party leaders
Prince Edward Island Liberal Party MLAs
20th-century Canadian lawyers
Canadian politicians of Lebanese descent